Lee Chang-Hoon (born December 17, 1986) is a South Korean footballer who plays as a winger for Malaysia Super League club Kelantan United.

Club career
On November 20, 2008, Gangwon was called as the third order at 2009 K-League Draft.

His first K-League match was against FC Seoul in Seoul, March 14, 2009. In this game, he won a penalty kick by causing a handball by FC Seoul's defender Kevin Hatchi. However Masahiro Ōhashi missed the resulting penalty kick. In spite of that, Gangwon won by 2–1. He scored his first pro goal against Jeonbuk on 27 June 2009.

On 4 July 2011, he move to Seongnam Ilhwa Chunma.

Melaka United
On 30 May 2018, Lee signed a contract with Malaysia Super League club Melaka United.

Career statistics

Club

Honours
Penang FA
 Malaysia Premier League :2020

References

External links
 

1986 births
Living people
South Korean footballers
Gangwon FC players
Seongnam FC players
Gimcheon Sangmu FC players
K League 1 players
K League 2 players
Malaysia Premier League players
Association football midfielders
Melaka United F.C. players
Sarawak United FC players
Sportspeople from Incheon